Carla Porta Musa (15 March 190210 October 2012) was an Italian supercentenarian, essayist and poet.

Musa was born in Como, Italy, to Maria Casella and Enrico Musa, a well known engineer in Milan. Her passion for books started on her sixth birthday when her father gave her a small library which she shared with her three siblings. She studied in Lausanne, Switzerland, Bushey, United Kingdom, and Paris, France.

She died on 10 October 2012 at Valduce Hospital in Como from pneumonia complications, aged 110 years, 209 days.

Partial bibliography 
Le tre zitelle, 2010
Villa Elisabetta, 2008
Lasciati prender per mano, 2007
La ribelle incatenata, 2005
Nel segno di Chiara, 1998
Il cielo nel cuore, 1997
Il suo cane ciao e altre storie, 1995
Le stagioni di Chiara, 1994
Il tuo cuore e il mio, 1992
Lampi al magnesio, 1991
La luna di traverso, 1965
Il cortile, 1961
Storia di Peter, 1960
Girometta e Pampacoca, 1960
La breve estate, 1959
Liberata, 1958
Virginia 1880, 1955
Quaderno rosso, 1954
Nuovi momenti lirici, 1953
Momenti Lirici, 1950

References 

1902 births
2012 deaths
Italian supercentenarians
Italian women essayists
Italian essayists
Italian women poets
People from Como
20th-century Italian poets
21st-century Italian poets
20th-century Italian women writers
21st-century Italian women writers
20th-century Italian non-fiction writers
21st-century Italian non-fiction writers
20th-century essayists
21st-century essayists
Women supercentenarians
Deaths from pneumonia in Lombardy
Writers from Lombardy